Irfan Zaman (born 11 November 1991) is a Pakistani cricketer. He made his first-class debut for Lahore Ravi in the 2008–09 Quaid-e-Azam Trophy on 25 February 2009.

References

External links
 

1991 births
Living people
Pakistani cricketers
Place of birth missing (living people)
Lahore Ravi cricketers
Lahore Whites cricketers